Gerardo Chowell is professor of mathematical epidemiology and chair of the Department of Population Health Sciences in the School of Public Health at Georgia State University. He grew up in Colima, Mexico, where he became interested in mathematics as a child. He graduated from the University of Colima in 2001 before beginning the summer program at Cornell University's Mathematical and Theoretical Biology Institute. He later decided to enroll in the Ph.D. program at Cornell, which he completed in 2005 under the supervision of Carlos Castillo-Chavez.

References

External links
 Faculty page
 

Living people
Mexican emigrants to the United States
People from Colima City
Cornell University alumni
Georgia State University faculty
Arizona State University faculty
American epidemiologists
21st-century American mathematicians
Year of birth missing (living people)